Solar cycle 25 is the current solar cycle, the 25th since 1755, when extensive recording of solar sunspot activity began. It began in December 2019 with a minimum smoothed sunspot number of 1.8. It is expected to continue until about 2030.

Predictions
Widely varying predictions regarding the strength of cycle 25 ranged from very weak with suggestions of slow slide in to a Maunder minimum like state to a weak cycle similar to previous cycle 24 and even a strong cycle. Upton and Hathaway predicted that the weakness of cycle 25 would make it part of the Modern Gleissberg Minimum. 

This prediction is in line with the current general agreement in the scientific literature, which holds that solar cycle 25 will be weaker than average (i.e. weaker than during the exceptionally strong Modern Maximum). However, observations from 2020 to 2022, the first three years of the cycle, significantly exceed predicted values.

Early signs

As of April 2018, the Sun showed signs of a reverse magnetic polarity sunspot appearing and beginning this solar cycle. It is typical during the transition from one cycle to the next to experience a period where sunspots of both polarities exist (during the solar minimum). The polarward reversed polarity sunspots suggested that a transition to cycle 25 was in process. The first cycle 25 sunspot may have appeared in early April 2018 or even December 2016.

In November 2019, two reversed polarity sunspots appeared, possibly signaling the onset of cycle 25.

Nandy et al., analyzed the polarity orientation of bipolar magnetic regions observed in December 2019 and concluded that magnetic regions with the underlying orientation of solar cycle 25 toroidal field component were brewing in the solar convection zone, representing early signs of the new cycle.

Supersynoptic (time vs. solar latitude) map of the radial component of the solar magnetic field for cycles 24-25 based on observations from the Global Oscillations Network Group (GONG) shows magnetic activity of cycle 25 beginning November 2019 at about 30 degree latitudes in both solar hemispheres.
A more recent supersynoptic map is available.

The following table gives the number of days so far in cycle 25 against the number up to the same point in cycle 24, and also up to the end of 2012 in cycle 24, which have passed various thresholds for the numbers of sunspots.

As at Mar 11 2023, solar cycle 25 is averaging 17% more spots per day than solar cycle 24 at the same point in the cycle (Mar 11 2012).
Year 4 of solar cycle 25 (Dec 1 2022 to Mar 11 2023) is averaging 47% more spots per day than the corresponding period in solar cycle 24.

Events

2020

On 29 May, the first C-class solar flares of Solar Cycle 25 took place, as well as the first M-class flare. Solar activity continued to increase in the following months, especially abruptly in October, with flares taking place on a near-daily basis by November. On 29 November, an M4.4 flare, the strongest of the cycle to date, took place, possibly indicating the solar cycle would be more active than initially thought.

On 8 December, a small coronal mass ejection was found heading directly towards Earth shortly after a strong C-class solar flare, hitting the planet on 9-10 December and causing bright aurorae at high latitudes.

2021

The first X-class solar flare of the cycle took place on 3 July, peaking at X1.59.

On 22 July, a total of six different active regions were seen on the solar disk for the first time since 6 September 2017.

On 9 October, a M1.6 class solar flare erupted sending a coronal mass ejection that hit earth on 12 October triggering a (moderate) G2 geomagnetic storm.

The second X-class flare of the solar cycle erupted on 28 October, producing a CME and a S1 solar radiation storm. Reports initially predicted that the CME could graze Earth, however geomagnetic storms on 30-31 October only reached a moderate K index of 4.

On 3 and 4 November, the K index reached 8-, equivalent to a G4 geomagnetic storm. This was the most intense geomagnetic storm to hit Earth since September 2017.

2022

In late March, sunspot region 2975 released X1.3 and M9.6 flares, the former causing a G1 geomagnetic storm on 31 March despite being near the solar limb. The region rotated out of view of Earth on 5 April, but helioseismic measurements on April 8 showed it still active on the far side of the Sun. On 12 April, a Coronal Mass Ejection on the far side likely erupted from the region, with helioseismic measurements showing the region to have intensified since crossing over the limb. As the region began rotating into view from Earth, a possibly X-class flare occurred on 15 April. 

After rotating to the visible hemisphere of the Sun, the regions of the sunspot complex were designated 2993 through 2996. On 17 April, sunspot group 2994 released an X1.2 flare. However, the complex's activity subsided slightly in the next few days. While crossing the solar limb, sunspot region 2992 emitted M7.3 and X2.2 flares, the latter being the strongest of the cycle yet.

2023

See also
Active region

References

External links
 
 
 

Solar cycles